Border river may refer to

 a river that forms a natural border
 Border River, a 1954 film